The following units and commanders of the Confederate army fought in the Battle of Globe Tavern from August 18 to 21, 1864. The Union order of battle is listed separately.

Abbreviations used

Military rank
 Gen = General
 LTG = Lieutenant General
 MG = Major General
 BG = Brigadier General
 Col = Colonel
 Ltc = Lieutenant Colonel
 Maj = Major
 Cpt = Captain
 Lt = Lieutenant

Other
 (w) = wounded
 (mw) = mortally wounded
 (k) = killed in action
 (c) = captured

August 18–19

Operations south of Petersburg
Gen P. G. T. Beauregard, Petersburg Defense Force

Third Corps, Army of Northern Virginia

August 21

Operations south of Petersburg
Gen P.G.T. Beauregard, Petersburg Defense Force

Third Corps, Army of Northern Virginia

LTG A. P. Hill

Cavalry Corps, Army of Northern Virginia

Sources
 Calkins, Chris. "The Battle of Weldon Railroad (or Globe Tavern), August 18–19 & 21, 1864", in Blue & Gray, Volume XXIII, issue 5 (Winter 2007). ISSN 0741-2207.
 Katcher, Philip. The Army of Robert E. Lee. London, United Kingdom: Arms and Armour Press, 1994. .
 Trudeau, Noah Andre. The Last Citadel: Petersburg, Virginia June 1864–April 1865. Little, Brown and Company, 1991. .

American Civil War orders of battle